The Ocean of Light International School, located in Tonga, is a private international Baháʼí school dedicated to the development of the spiritual, intellectual, and physical potential of the students and to the fostering of a new world society identifying itself with the principles of a world citizenship, a universal value system, a world embracing administrative, economic, social and educational systems based on the concept of unity in diversity, established in 1996. To achieve this the School aims to develop in the students those capacities, skills, habits and attitudes necessary to enable them to provide for their families; to effectively contribute to the peace, prosperity and tranquillity of mankind and society; and to participate in the creation of new institutions, processes and relationships as they are defined and established.

The School is directly administered by a non-profit Board of Education nominated by the National Spiritual Assembly of the Baha'is of Tonga. The school is known as a Bahai school and is striving to incorporate Bahai ideals, principles and concepts into the curriculum and organization of the school. The school is located in Kolomotua / Hofoa - about 3 kilometers from the centre of Nukualofa. It offers classes from kindergarten (3 years old) to high school diploma using Cambridge International Examinations including the International General Certificate of Secondary Education.

The school is listed by the Australian Defense Department as a Primary and Secondary "Benchmark school" for those posted to Tonga.

Events
 Crown Prince Tupoutoa of Tonga cut the ribbon to open the new buildings at the school.
2006 Prime Minister of the Kingdom of Tonga, the Honorable Dr. Fred Sevele praised the Ocean of Light School for its educational philosophy of academics and spiritual virtues at the school's 10th anniversary celebration.

References

External links
 Official Website

Bahá'í educational institutions
Schools in Tonga
Cambridge schools in Tonga
Educational institutions established in 1996
International high schools
1996 establishments in Tonga
Tongatapu